Khnach Romeas is a khum (commune) of Bavel District in Battambang Province in north-western Cambodia.

Villages

 Prey Sangha  ព្រៃសង្ហារ
 Kaoh Ream  កោះរាម
 Rung Ampil
 Ballang Leu
 Svay Sa
 Khnach Romeas
 Ballang Mean Chey
 Chroy Sna

References

Communes of Battambang province
Bavel District